Car, Armoured, Heavy (Aust), also known as Rhino, was an armoured car designed in Australia during the Second World War. Due to enemy action and design problems the project never got beyond a prototype stage.

History
At the outbreak of the Second World War, the United Kingdom was unable to meet the needs of the Commonwealth for armoured fighting vehicles. This led many Commonwealth countries to develop their own AFVs.

In mid-to-late 1941 a specification for a heavy armoured car was issued by the Australian Directorate of Armoured Fighting Vehicles Production. Two prototype hulls and turrets were built and tested on the same chassis in 1942. The vehicle suffered from excessive weight and in 1943 the project was cancelled.

The vehicle utilised a Canadian Military Pattern truck chassis and engine produced by General Motors Canada, the rear-engined Model 8446 with GMC Model 270 engine. The same chassis as used for the Canadian Fox Armoured Car. The vehicle was completed by a welded turret with 30 mm all-round protection similar in design to that of the Crusader tank. The armament consisted of a QF 2-pounder Mk IX gun and a coaxial .303-inch Vickers machine gun.

A pilot model of an armoured personnel carrier with an open-topped hull and no turret was also built.

References
Notes

Bibliography

Further reading
	David Fletcher "The Dingo, the Rover & the Rhino" (February 2021) Classic Military Vehicle

External links
Australian CMP Based Armoured Vehicles
Rhino Armored Car at warwheels.net

World War II armoured cars
World War II armoured fighting vehicles of Australia